Richmond Park is an area of Bournemouth, Dorset, England. The area is north of Richmond Hill and Springbourne, east of Charminster, west of Queen's Park and south of Winton and Queen's Park.

History 
Richmond Park was the location of two murders in 2002; the Murder of Jong-Ok Shin and the Murder of Heather Barnett.

Buildings 

 Richmond Park Church
 Malmesbury Park Primary School

Areas 
Malmesbury Park is in the south of Richmond Park, and was formerly land owned by James Harris, 3rd Earl of Malmesbury.

Culture 
Richmond Park has a bowls club.

Politics 
Richmond Park is part of the Queen's Park ward for elections to Bournemouth, Christchurch and Poole Council which elect two councillors.

Richmond Park is part of the Bournemouth East parliamentary constituency, for elections to the House of Commons of the United Kingdom.

References 

Areas of Bournemouth